Oottara is a small locality in Vadavannur Panchayat near Kollengode Town in Palakkad District of Kerala State in India. The Kollengode Railway station is located at Oottara. It is situated on the Kollengode Palakkad route. It lies on Palakkad-Kollengode road and connecting point for road to Malayampallam, Muthalamada and onward to Pollachi.

The new broad gauge railway line from Palakkad to Rameswaram pass by oottara, helping the commuters in this region to access Pollachi, Pazhani Murugan Temple, Palakkad Town, Udumalpet, Dindugal, Madurai and Rameswaram.

References

Villages in Palakkad district